Tetsuya Endo may refer to:

, Japanese anime director
, Japanese professional wrestler